Raymond John McLean (September 13, 1897 – October 1967) was a fullback in the National Football League. He played with the Green Bay Packers during the 1921 NFL season.

References

Players of American football from Detroit
Green Bay Packers players
American football fullbacks
1897 births
1967 deaths